The 1990 Korean Professional Football League was the eighth season of K League since its establishment in 1983. The South Korean clubs relocated their hometowns from provinces to cities in this year. Daewoo Royals also hired Frank Engel, the first foreign manager in the league.

League table

Awards

Main awards

Source:

Best XI

Source:

References

External links
 RSSSF

K League seasons
1
South Korea
South Korea